Minuscule 496 (in the Gregory-Aland numbering), δ 360 (in the Soden numbering), is a Greek minuscule manuscript of the New Testament, on parchment. Palaeographically it has been assigned to the 13th-century. Scrivener labelled it by number 582. The manuscript has complex contents with full marginalia and liturgical books.

Description 

The codex contains the whole New Testament except Apocalypse on 300 parchment leaves (size ). It has not any lacunae. The text is written in one column per page, 33-40 lines per page.

The text of the Gospels has also another division according to the smaller Ammonian Sections, with references to the Eusebian Canons (written below Ammonian Section numbers).

The order of books is a usual: Gospels, Acts, Catholic epistles, and Pauline epistles. The pericope John 7:53-8:11 is omitted.

Text 

The Greek text of the codex is a representative of the Byzantine text-type. According to Hermann von Soden it is related to the Byzantine commentated text. Aland placed it in Category V.
It contains many important various readings, e.g. it countenances codices Sinaiticus, Vaticanus, and Regius in Luke 11:2.4. According to the Claremont Profile Method it represents the textual group 1167 in Luke 1, Luke 10, and Luke 20.

The text was corrected.

History 

The manuscript was dated to the 13th or 14th-century. Currently it is dated by the INTF to the 13th-century.

In 1846 the manuscript was bought together with the codex 495 from captain C. K. MacDonald, who visited Sinai (and saw Codex Sinaiticus). The manuscript was added to the list of New Testament manuscripts by Scrivener (582) and C. R. Gregory (496). It was examined by Scrivener and Bloomfield.

It is currently housed at the British Library (Add MS 16184) in London.

See also 

 List of New Testament minuscules
 Biblical manuscript
 Textual criticism

References

Further reading

External links 
 Add MS 16184 at the British Library

Greek New Testament minuscules
13th-century biblical manuscripts
British Library additional manuscripts